Georg Josef Wilhelm Aloys Rinck von Baldenstein (1704–1762) was the Prince-Bishop of Basel from 1744 to 1762.

Biography

Josef Wilhelm Rinck von Baldenstein was born in Saignelégier on 9 February 1704.

He was ordained as a priest on 31 March 1736.  On 22 January 1744 the cathedral chapter of Basel Münster elected him to be the new Prince-Bishop of Basel, with Pope Benedict XIV confirming his appointment on 13 April 1744.  He was consecrated as a bishop on 22 November 1744.

He died on 13 September 1762.

References

1704 births
1762 deaths
Prince-Bishops of Basel